Sibirsky is a rural locality (a settlement) and the administrative center of Sibirsky Selsoviet, Pervomaysky District, Altai Krai, Russia. The population was 1,679 as of 2013. There are 29 streets.

Geography 
Sibirsky is located 27 km northwest of Novoaltaysk (the district's administrative centre) by road. Tsaplino is the nearest rural locality.

References 

Rural localities in Pervomaysky District, Altai Krai